Ghazaros (Lazarus) Aghayan was an Armenian writer, educator, folklorist, historian, linguist and public figure.

Biography
Aghayan was born in Bolnisi village (also known as Bolnis-Khachen), Tiflis Governorate (now Georgia). He received his early education in Bolnisi, and at the age of thirteen he entered to the Nersisyan School in Tiflis. He left the school after one year because of his family's financial problems. Aghayan traveled between Tiflis, Moscow, and Saint-Petersburg. In Moscow he cooperated with Hyusisapayl journal of Stepanos Nazarian, also worked as typesetter. 

Throughout his life he pursued many careers and professions. He was a hunter, a factory worker and a farm labourer before he joined fellow writer Mikael Nalbandian in the Armenian cultural and intellectual revival of the 19th century.  

In 1867 he returned to the Caucasus, worked as the manager of Etchmiadzin publishing house, and as an editor of “Ararat” monthly (1869-1870) of the Mother See of Holy Etchmiadzin. In 1870 he returned to Tiflis and dedicated himself to teaching. He taught in Akhaltskha, Alexandropol, Yerevan and Shushi, and supervised Armenian parochial schools of Georgia.  As a teacher he supported the democratization of education. Aghayan demanded clearing schools from the influence of clergy. He is an author of textbooks for Armenian schools and works on education. He also collaborated on "Aghbyur", an illustrated monthly for children.

In 1895 he was arrested on charges of belonging to the Hnchak Party, exiled to Nor-Nakhichevan and then Crimea (1898-1900). He was then under the control of the tsarist gendarmerie until the end of his life. In May 1902, celebrated the 40th anniversary of his literary activity. In 1905 he took part in the October rally in Tiflis, calling for the tsar to be overthrown.

He obtained great popularity in the sphere of children’s literature. Aghayan has translated works of Alexander Pushkin and Ivan Krylov. 

He died in Tiflis at the age of 71.

He was maternal grandfather of Lazar Sarian and Anatoliy Eiramdzhan and father-in-law of the painter Martiros Saryan.

Works 

1867 - "Arutiun and Manvel " (autobiographical novel)
1872 - "Two sisters " (social novel)
1888 - "Tork Angegh" (poems)
1893 - "The Main Events of My Life " (memoirs)
1881 - "Anahit" (tale)
1887 - "Aregnazan" (fairy tale)
1904 - "The Fairy Tales of Grandmother Gulnaz"
1908 - "Arevik" (educational book)

Bibliography
Collection of Works in 4 Volumes, Ed. and commented by A. Asatryan and others, Yerevan, 1962–1963 
Aghayan in Memoirs of Contemporaries, Yerevan, 1967. 529 pages.
Tork Angegh, by Ghazaros Aghayan, trans. by Agop J. Hacikyan, 80 pages, Gomidas Institute,

References

External links 

 Biography 
 «Քառասուն տարի» Հ․ Թումանյան
 «Ղ. Աղայանց (Քառասունամյակի օրը)» Հ․ Թումանյան
 «Տխուր հիշողություն (Ղազարի մահվան տարեդարձին)» Հ․ Թումանյան
Ghazaros Aghayan.Biography

1840 births
1911 deaths
Armenian people from the Russian Empire
19th-century Armenian writers
Writers from the Russian Empire
Burials at Armenian Pantheon of Tbilisi